Eos is an 1895 painting by Evelyn De Morgan. done in a Pre-Raphaelite style. It depicts the Greek goddess Eos, goddess of the dawn and of love, standing on a seashore, surrounded by birds and flowers and pouring water from a jug.

Eos is exhibited in the Columbia Museum of Art, Columbia, South Carolina.

See also
 Aurora and Cephalus, a 1733 painting by François Boucher which portrays Aurora, the Roman form of Eos

References

1895 paintings
Paintings by Evelyn De Morgan
Paintings of Greek goddesses
Birds in art
Water in art
Moon in art
Eos